Megachile subremotula is a species of bee in the family Megachilidae. It was described by Rayment in 1934.

References

Subremotula
Insects described in 1934